A list of films released in Japan in 1982 (see 1982 in film).

Box-office ranking

List of films

See also
1982 in Japan
1982 in Japanese television

References

Footnotes

Sources

External links
 Japanese films of 1982 at the Internet Movie Database

1982
Japanese
Films